Sorbonne University (: 'the Sorbonne') is a public research university located in Paris, France. The institution's legacy reaches back to 1257 when Sorbonne College was established by Robert de Sorbon as one of the first universities in Europe.

Sorbonne University is considered one of the most prestigious universities in Europe and the world. It has a world-class reputation in academia and industry; as of 2021, its alumni and professors have won 33 Nobel Prizes, six Fields Medals, and one Turing Award.

In the 2021 edition of the Academic Ranking of World Universities, Sorbonne University ranked 35th in the world, placing it as the fourth best university in continental Europe, and third in the fields of Mathematics and Oceanography. In the 2023 edition of QS World University Rankings, the Sorbonne ranked 60th in the world, placing it eighth in continental Europe, 14th in Natural Sciences and Mathematics, and seventh in Classics and Ancient History.

Known for its selectivity, Sorbonne University is one of the most sought after universities by students and researchers from France, Europe, and the French speaking countries. Most notably, Marie  Skłodowska-Curie, who came from Poland in 1891 and joined the faculty of sciences of the Sorbonne, was also the first woman to become a professor at the Sorbonne. Marie Curie and her husband Pierre Curie are considered the founders of the modern-day Faculty of Science and Engineering of Sorbonne University.

History

College of Sorbonne 
Robert de Sorbon (1201–1274), chaplain to King Louis IX (Saint Louis), observed the difficulties experienced by poor "schoolchildren" in achieving the rank of doctor. In February 1257, he had a house (domus) officially established which he intended for a certain number of secular clergy who, living in common and without concern for their material existence, would be entirely occupied with study and teaching. This house was named the college of Sorbonne.

The old slogan of the establishment, "Sorbonne University, creators of futures since 1257", refers to this date. The college of Sorbonne was closed along with all the other colleges of the former University of Paris in 1793.

The college of Sorbonne is located on the site of the current Sorbonne building, shared between Sorbonne University and Panthéon-Sorbonne University (Paris I) and Sorbonne Nouvelle University (Paris III).

Following the promulgation of laws in 28 April 1893, giving civil personality to the bodies formed by the union of several faculties of an academy, and 10 July 1896, giving the name of university to the bodies of faculties, the new University of Paris was created in 1896 through the merger of the Faculty of Science, the Faculty of Letters, the Faculty of Law, the Faculty of Medicine, the Faculty of Protestant Theology (created in 1877 and transformed into a free faculty in 1905), and the École supérieure de pharmacie. It was inaugurated on 19 November 1896 by its president, Félix Faure.

Splitting of the University of Paris 
The Universities of Paris-Sorbonne and Pierre-et-Marie-Curie were created as a result of the university reform prepared by Edgar Faure in 1968.

At that time, the University of Paris, divided into five faculties, was split into several interdisciplinary universities. Some, including the University of Paris-Sorbonne, retained the name "Sorbonne" and premises in the historic centre of the University of Paris, which had until then been mainly devoted to the Faculties of Arts and Sciences.

The University of Paris-VI is created from the majority of the teaching and research units of the Faculty of Sciences of Paris (the others joining the universities of Paris-VII Denis Diderot (now Université Paris Cité), Paris-Saclay University in Orsay, Paris-XII and Paris-XIII in Villetaneuse) and part of the units of the Faculty of Medicine of Paris (the others joining the universities of Paris-V René Descartes (now Université Paris Cité), Paris-VII Denis Diderot and Paris-XIII).

Reunification of the Universities of Paris IV and Paris VI 
In 2010, some of the direct successors of the faculties of the University of Paris created the Sorbonne Universities Association. The following universities, members of the group, decided to merge into Sorbonne University in 2018:

Paris-Sorbonne University (Paris IV) (1971–2017), formerly a constituent part of the faculty of humanities of the University of Paris.
Université Pierre et Marie Curie (Paris VI) (1971–2017), formerly a constituent part of the faculty of sciences and of the school of medicine of the University of Paris.

At the same time, the Sorbonne Universities Association was renamed the Sorbonne University Association; it includes the following institutions for academic cooperation:

 University of Technology of Compiègne (1972– )
 INSEAD
 National Museum of Natural History
 Centre international d’études pédagogiques (International Centre for Pedagogical Studies)
 Pôle supérieur d’enseignement artistique Paris Boulogne-Billancourt
 Four research institutes

As part of the reforms of French Higher Education, on 19 March 2018, the international jury called by the French Government for the "Initiative d'excellence" (IDEX) confirmed the definite win of Sorbonne University. Consequently, Sorbonne University won an endowment of 900 Million euros with no limit of time. This is the first higher education institution in Paris region to win such an endowment. The university was established by a decree issued 21 April 2017, taking effect 1 January 2018.

Faculties 
Sorbonne University has three faculties: Arts and Humanities, Science and Engineering, and Medicine.

Arts and humanities 
The Faculty of Arts and Humanities provides studies in arts, languages, letters, and human and social sciences, and is the largest in France. Fields such as history, geography, languages, linguistics, musicology, philosophy, classical and modern literature, foreign literature and civilisations, and the history of art and archaeology are part of this faculty.

Science and engineering 
The Faculty of Science and Engineering of Sorbonne University is a major research institution in France. It can be considered the successor in direct line to the Faculty of Science of the University of Paris with the Paris-Saclay Faculty of Sciences.

It has 79 laboratories in the Paris region, most in association with the Centre national de la recherche scientifique (CNRS). Some of the most notable institutes and laboratories include the Institut Henri Poincaré (Mathematics), Institut d'astrophysique de Paris (Astrophysics), LIP6 (Informatics / Computer Science), Institut des systèmes intelligents et de robotique (Robotics), Institut de mathématiques de Jussieu – Paris Rive Gauche (foundations of Mathematics, shared with University of Paris) and the Laboratoire Kastler-Brossel (Quantum Physics, shared with PSL University).

Medicine 
The Faculty of Medicine is associated with the Assistance Publique–Hôpitaux de Paris, the Sorbonne University Hospital Group (Hôpital Charles-Foix, Pitié-Salpêtrière Hospital, Hôpital Fondation Rothschild, Hôpital Saint-Antoine, Hôpital Tenon, Hôpital Armand-Trousseau, Hôpital de La Roche-Guyon) and the Quinze-Vingts National Ophthalmology Hospital, promoting multidisciplinary research, and training doctors and other health professionals.

Law (external tuition) 
There is no Law school as such in Sorbonne University. In 1971, most of the law professors from the Faculty of Law and Economics of the University of Paris decided to restructure it as a university, called Panthéon-Assas University (after the two main campuses of the Paris Law Faculty: place du Panthéon and rue d’Assas campuses). Panthéon-Assas now provides legal studies for Sorbonne University as an independent university.

Campuses

Sorbonne 

Sorbonne University's historical campus is in the historic central Sorbonne building, located at 47 rue des Écoles, in the historic Latin Quarter of Paris. The building is the undivided property of the 13 successor universities of the University of Paris, managed by the Chancellerie des Universités de Paris. Besides the monuments of the Cour d'honneur, the Sorbonne Chapel and the Grand amphitéâtre, the building houses the Academy of Paris Rectorat, the Chancellerie des Universités de Paris, part of the universities Paris 1 Pantheon-Sorbonne, Sorbonne Nouvelle Paris 3, Sorbonne University, University of Paris and the École Nationale des Chartes as well as the École pratique des hautes études that are constituent schools of PSL University.

Before the 19th century, the Sorbonne occupied several buildings. The chapel was built in 1622 by the then-Provisor of the University of Paris, Cardinal Richelieu, during the reign of Louis XIII. In 1881, politician Jules Ferry decided to convert the Sorbonne into one single building. Under the supervision of Pierre Greard, Chief Officer of the Education Authority of Paris, Henri-Paul Nénot constructed the current building from 1883 to 1901 that reflects a basic architectural uniformity. The integration of the chapel into the whole was also Nénot's work with the construction of a cour d'honneur. The Sorbonne building is generally reserved for undergraduate students in their third year and graduate students in certain academic disciplines. Only students in Semitic studies, regardless of level, take all their classes at the Sorbonne campus.

The Library of the Sorbonne is an inter-university library of the universities Paris 1 Pantheon-Sorbonne, Sorbonne Nouvelle Paris 3, Sorbonne University, University of Paris, under the administration of Paris 1 Pantheon-Sorbonne. It is open exclusively to undergraduate students in their third year and graduate students. With the former archives of the now-defunct University of Paris, 2,500,000 books, 400,000 of them ancient, 2,500 historical manuscripts, 18,000 doctoral dissertation papers, 17,750 past and current French and international periodicals and 7,100 historical printing plates, the Library of the Sorbonne is the largest university library in Paris and was entirely refurbished in 2013.

Jussieu 

The largest of Sorbonne University's campuses is Jussieu Campus, officially named "Pierre and Marie Curie campus". It houses the Faculty of Sciences. The first buildings are from 1957. The main part of the campus, the "Gril d'Albert," was built in 1964, and was completely refurbished from 1996 to 2016.

It houses six university libraries, including an important research library in mathematics and computer science.

Maison de la Recherche 

The Maison de la Recherche campus is the central building for doctoral studies that hosts the history and geography departments. It houses the Serpente Library that has 55,000 works and 292 past and current French and international periodicals. All doctoral dissertations since 1 January 1986 have been stored at the Serpente Library.

Clignancourt and Malesherbes 
Two other campuses are the Clignancourt and Malesherbes centers. Undergraduate students in their first and second years of study in Philosophy, History, Geography, Musicology, English and Spanish take their classes at the Clignancourt center. The Clignancourt Library contains 78,000 works, 210 French and international periodicals and 800 educational DVDs.

Undergraduate students in their first and second years of study in French literature, French language, Latin, and Ancient Greek take their classes at the Malesherbes center. All undergraduate students in these academic disciplines study in the central Sorbonne building in their third year. Undergraduate and graduate students in German studies, Slavic studies, Italic studies and Romanian studies, regardless of level, take all of their classes at the Malesherbes center. The Malesherbes center also hosts three research centers in Italian culture, the cultures and literature of central Europe and the Balkans and the Germanic, Nordic and Dutch centers. The Malesherbes Library contains 200,000 works specializing in the study of foreign languages and cultures and 1,200 past and current French and international periodicals. More than 50,000 doctoral dissertations are available for public viewing.

Institut d'Art et d'Archéologie 

Undergraduate Art History and Archeology students take their classes at the Institut d'Art et d'Archéologie, located at the main entrance of the Jardin du Luxembourg. Constructed by architect Paul Bigot between 1925 and 1930, the Mesopotamian-style building was classified as a national historic building in 1996. It hosts the Michelet Library that contains 100,000 volumes of work on art history and archeology with 100 French and international periodicals. Only 10,000 of the art history and archeology works are open to students, the others requiring special authorization of usage. Graduate Art History and Archeology students take their courses at the Institut National de l'Histoire de l'Art in the Galerie Colbert, a partnered national institution of the university.

Other campuses in Paris 

Both the Institut d'Urbanisme et d'Aménagement and the Institut d'Etudes hispaniques in the Latin Quarter host third year and graduate students of Geography and Iberian and Latin American studies. The Marcel Bataillon Library houses the Institut d'Etudes hispaniques' collection of 25,000 works on Iberian and Latin-American culture. Catalan studies take place at the Centre d'Etudes catalanes in the Marais.

The Sorbonne university also includes Campus Pitié and Campus Saint-Antoine for the study of medicine ; Campus Les Cordeliers, Campus Curie and Campus Raspail for sciences studies.

Sorbonne University Abu Dhabi 

An exclusive international agreement between Sorbonne and the government of Abu Dhabi was signed on 19 February 2006, starting plans to bring Sorbonne University to Abu Dhabi. Sorbonne University Abu Dhabi (SUAD) was established on 30 May 2008 on Reem Island by a decree of the ruler of Abu Dhabi of the United Arab Emirates. All programs are taught in the French language except for the Bachelor of Physics and most of the masters programmes, that are taught in English . An intensive French language programme is offered for one or two year(s) to students who do not meet the French language requirement for registration. The establishment of the university demonstrates the keenness of Abu Dhabi to create an international hub in culture and education, having also signed a contract with the Louvre in 2007 to create the Louvre Abu Dhabi, and with New York University in 2007 to create New York University Abu Dhabi. SUAD is jointly governed by the Abu Dhabi Education Council (ADEC) and by SUAD's board of trustees, with six members, three of whom are appointed by the home Sorbonne University and the other three appointed by the Abu Dhabi Executive Council. The president of SUAD is the president of Sorbonne University in Paris, currently Prof Nathalie Drach-Temam. Academic programmes are offered at both undergraduate and postgraduate levels in the social sciences, humanities, law and sciences.

Academics

International partnerships 
Sorbonne students can study abroad for a semester or a year at partner institutions such as McGill University, University of Toronto, King's College London, and University of Warwick.

Rankings and reputation 
Sorbonne University is consistently ranked in the top universities in Europe and the world. The first recognition of its existence as an integrated university came in 2018, 
when it appeared on the CWUR World University Rankings 2018–2019 in 29th place globally and 1st place in France.

In the Academic Ranking of World Universities 2020, Sorbonne University is ranked in range 39 globally and 3rd in France.

In the Times Higher Education European Teaching Rankings 2019, Sorbonne University was ranked in 3rd place in France (after Paris-Sud University and Claude Bernard University Lyon 1).

In the Times Higher Education World Reputation Rankings 2019, Sorbonne University was ranked in range 51-60 globally and 2nd in France.

The 2021 QS World University Rankings ranked Sorbonne University 83rd overall in the world and 3rd in France. Individual faculties at Sorbonne University also featured in the rankings.

Before the merger of Paris-Sorbonne University and Pierre and Marie Curie University, both had their own rankings in the world.

Its founding predecessor Paris-Sorbonne University was ranked 222 in the world by the QS World University Rankings 2015. By faculty, it was ranked 9 in modern languages, 36 in arts and humanities (1st in France), and 127 in social sciences and management (5th in France). By academic reputation, it was ranked 80 (2nd in France), according to the QS World University Rankings, and 2nd in overall highest international reputation of all academic institutions in France, according to the Times Higher Education 2015. In 2014 Paris-Sorbonne ranked 227 in the world, according to the QS World University Rankings, 115 for Social Sciences and Management, 33 for Arts and Humanities.

Pierre and Marie Curie University was often ranked as the best university in France. In 2014 UPMC was ranked 35th in the world, 6th in Europe and 1st in France by the Academic Ranking of World Universities. It was ranked 4th in the world in the field of mathematics by the same study. The 2013 QS World University Rankings ranked the university 112th overall in the world and 3rd in France. In 2013, according to University Ranking by Academic Performance (URAP), Université Pierre et Marie Curie is ranked first university in France, and 44th in the world.  UPMC is a member of Sorbonne University Association.

Organization
Members have worked on several projects in order to strengthen the relations between them and potentially create a new international institution. The most famous projects are the "Sorbonne College" (Collège de la Sorbonne) for bachelor's degrees and the "Sorbonne Doctoral College" (Collège doctoral de la Sorbonne) for graduate students.

The Sorbonne College
Since 2014, the Sorbonne College for bachelor's degrees ("Collège des Licences de la Sorbonne") has been coordinating the academic projects of Sorbonne University with Panthéon-Assas University, the law school of the Sorbonne University Group which has not merged into the Sorbonne University and remained independent. It also offers cross-institutional academic courses in many fields, allowing students to graduate from both institutions. For example, some cross-institutional bachelor's degrees ("double licences") are proposed to students in :
Science and History (Sorbonne)
Science and Musicology (Sorbonne)
Science and Philosophy (Sorbonne)
Science and Chinese (Sorbonne)
Science and German (Sorbonne)
Law and History (Panthéon-Assas / Sorbonne)
Law and Art History (Panthéon-Assas / Sorbonne)
Law and Science (Panthéon-Assas / Sorbonne)
History and Media (Sorbonne / Panthéon-Assas)

As it is the case in the Anglo-American university system, Sorbonne University proposes a major-minor system, that is currently being deployed at the university.

Sorbonne University, in partnership with INSEAD, also offers all of its alumni and PhD students a professionalizing course in business management to complete their curriculum.

The Doctoral College

Since 2010, every PhD student is being delivered an honorary diploma labeled Sorbonne University. This diploma highlights and gathers the skills of the doctors and researchers from the institutions that form Sorbonne University.

The Sorbonne Doctoral College, created in 2013, coordinates the activities of the 26 doctoral schools. Since 2014, it has developed cross-disciplinary Ph.Ds between the different members of the Sorbonne University Association.

Since 2011, Sorbonne University celebrates its graduates in a formal ceremony where every Ph.D. graduate wears a scholar uniform.

Research
To strengthen the influence of its research infrastructures at the international level, Sorbonne University has developed several research programs aiming at reinforcing or exploring new fields of study. This innovative cross-disciplinary approach was embodied with the creation of four new academic positions gathering several establishments of the group:
A Department of Digital Humanities, exploring the use of digital technologies in the social science
A Department of Polychromatic Studies of Societies, associating architecture, anthropology, chemical physics, literature and art history
A Department of Digital Health, exploring biomedical tools
A Department of 3D Craniofacial Reconstruction

Sorbonne University has formed several partnerships enabling bilateral research programswith academic institutions such as the China Scholarship Council or the Brazilian foundation FAPERJ.

Sorbonne University is a member of the League of European Research Universities, which gathers 23 European universities such as Cambridge and Oxford.

Collections

Scientific collections
The Sorbonne University houses eight notable scientific collections that are open to researchers. Some collections are open to the public as noted.

 Minerals – over 1500 minerals on display in 24 cases, open to the public
 Physics experiments models – models built by professors from the Sorbonne and UPMC in order to demonstrate different principles of physics
 Zoology – teaching collection of stuffed specimens, skeletal mounts, fluid parts, anatomical casts and insect boxes
 Paleontology – research collection of fossil invertebrates
 G. Lippmann collection – Research collection of 46 photographic plates created by Gabriel Lippmann in his studies of photography and the physics of light
 Charcot library – Research collection of the personal library of neurologist Jean-Martin Charcot
 Paleobotany – Research collection of Fossil plants 
 Musée Dupuytren – moved from Cordeliers, will be open to the public occasionally, features wax anatomical items and preserved specimens illustrating diseases and malformations.

Recent Nobel, Fields and Turing laureates 
 Emmanuelle Charpentier – BA, Master and PhD - Nobel in Chemistry – 2020
 Gérard Mourou – PhD - Nobel in Physics – 2018
 Serge Haroche – PhD and Professor - Nobel in Physics – 2012
 Claude Cohen-Tannoudji – Professor - Nobel in Physics – 1997
 Françoise Barré-Sinoussi – Grad Attendee - Nobel in Physiology or Medicine – 2008
 Cédric Villani – Grad Attendee (DEA) and former director of the Institut Henri Poincaré - Fields Medal – 2010
 Ngô Bảo Châu - BA - Fields Medal - 2010
 Wendelin Werner – PhD - Fields Medal – 2006
 Pierre-Louis Lions – PhD - Fields Medal – 1994
 Alain Connes – PhD and Professor - Fields Medal – 1982
 Yann LeCun – PhD - Turing Award – 2018

Notable alumni 
 Marie Curie, Professor at the Sorbonne, first woman to win a Nobel Prize, the first person and the only woman to win the Nobel Prize twice, and the only person to win the Nobel Prize in two scientific fields.
 Taha Hussein, was one of the most influential 20th-century Middle-Eastern writers and intellectuals, he was nominated for a Nobel Prize in literature fourteen times. Minister of education in 1950.
 Charlotte and Laura Tremble, French synchronized swimmers
 Yann LeCun, Professor at New York University and Head of AI at Facebook, "founding father of convolutional nets"
 Jacqueline Ki-Zerbo,  Malian women's rights  activist, pro-democracy activist and participant in the endogenous development of Africa

See also
Pierre et Marie Curie University
Latin Quarter
Laboratoire d'Informatique de Paris 6

Notes

References 
 THE - France’s most iconic university, the Sorbonne, is reborn
 University World News, Merger of elite Paris universities gets the go-ahead
 Le Figaro, Le retour de la grande université de Paris
 Study International, Consolidation of two elite Paris universities confirmed for 2018
 The Pie News, Mega university planned for Paris’s Left Bank

External links
 Official website of the university. 
 Official website of the project.
 Official website  of the Sorbonne University Association.
 Decree officially creating the university.

 
Educational institutions established in 2018
2018 establishments in France
Buildings and structures in the 5th arrondissement of Paris
Universities and colleges formed by merger in France